Henry James Snaith (born 1978)  is a professor in physics in the Clarendon Laboratory at the University of Oxford. Research from his group has led to the creation of a new research field, based on halide perovskites for use as solar absorbers. Many individuals who were PhD students and postdoctoral researchers in Snaith's group have now established research groups, independent research portfolios and commercial enterprises. He co-founded Oxford Photovoltaics in 2010 to commercialise perovskite based tandem solar cells.

Education
Snaith was educated at Gresham's School, an independent school in Norfolk, from 1989 to 1996. He completed his undergraduate studies at the University of Bristol, followed by postgraduate research at the University of Cambridge where he was awarded a PhD in 2005 for research on polymer solar cells supervised by Richard Friend.

Career and research
Following his PhD, Snaith did two years of postdoctoral research with Michael Grätzel at the École Polytechnique Fédérale de Lausanne (EPFL). He returned to the Cavendish Laboratory as a Junior Research Fellow at Clare College, Cambridge in 2006. Following this, Snaith was appointed a Research Councils UK (RCUK) research fellow while at the University of Oxford, then promoted to Reader and Professor. According to a biography from the Materials Research Society (MRS): 

Snaith's research has been funded by the Engineering and Physical Sciences Research Council (EPSRC). Snaith has supervised numerous PhD students and postdoctoral researchers in his lab including Priti Tiwana, Michael Brown, Pablo Docampo, Andrew Hey, Michael Lee, Tomas Leijtens, Varun Sivaram, Michael Saliba, Nakita Noel, Giles Eperon, and Severin Habisreutinger.

Awards and honours
Snaith was elected a Fellow of the Royal Society (FRS) in 2015. His certificate of election reads: 

In 2012, Snaith was Institute of Physics Clifford Paterson Medal and Prize for "his important contributions to the field of excitonic solar cells".

In 2014, Snaith was awarded the MRS Outstanding Young Investigator Award. He was awarded the Patterson Medal of the Institute of Physics in 2012, and named as one of Nature'''s ten people who mattered in 2013.

In 2015, Snaith was ranked number two on the list of The World's Most Influential Scientific Minds'', a citation analysis identifying the scientists who have made the most significant impact within their respective field of study by the Intellectual Property (IP) and Science business of Thomson Reuters. In May 2016, he was awarded the EU-40 Materials Prize from the European Material Research Society.

In October 2017, he was awarded the Institute of Physics James Joule Medal and Prize for the discovery and development of organic-inorganic metal-halide perovskite solar cells. In September 2020, he was awarded the prestigious Becquerel Prize in honour of his contributions to the use of perovskites as solar cells.

References

External links
 

Living people
Fellows of the Royal Society
Alumni of the University of Cambridge
Academics of the University of Oxford
21st-century British  physicists
1978 births
People associated with renewable energy
People educated at Gresham's School